Andreu Vivó Tomás (3 February 1978 – 30 December 2012) was a Spanish male artistic gymnast, representing his nation at international competitions.  He participated at the 2000 Summer Olympics. He also competed at the 2002, 2003 and 2005 World Artistic Gymnastics Championships. He won the gold medal in the team all-around event at the 2005 Mediterranean Games together with Víctor Cano, Manuel Carballo, Rafael Martínez and Iván San Miguel.

Vivo died of a heart attack when he was mountain climbing in the morning on 31 December 2012 in San Juan de Torruella. He began to feel ill after climbing the Collbaix peak in the Catalan district with a friend and collapsed soon after beginning the descent. When emergency management personnel arrived they were unable to revive him. His funeral was in Manresa, his hometown, at the Church of Christ the King.

References

External links
 

1978 births
2012 deaths
Spanish male artistic gymnasts
Sportspeople from Manresa
Gymnasts at the 2000 Summer Olympics
Olympic gymnasts of Spain
Universiade medalists in gymnastics
Mediterranean Games silver medalists for Spain
Mediterranean Games medalists in gymnastics
Competitors at the 2005 Mediterranean Games
Universiade bronze medalists for Spain
20th-century Spanish people
21st-century Spanish people